Fileja is a type of pasta typically from the province of Vibo Valentia, Calabria. Made of durum wheat semolina and water, they are prepared by wrapping a sheet of pasta around a thin cane (dinaciulu), creating a hollow tube approximately 20 cm in length.

See also 
 Busiate
 Casarecce

References 

Types of pasta
Cuisine of Calabria
Vibo Valentia